Jaak Aab (born 9 April 1960) is an Estonian politician of the Centre Party who has served as  Minister of Education and Research and three times as the Minister of Public Administration from 2017 to 2018, from 2019 to 2020 and from 2011 to 2022 and as the Minister of Social Affairs (Estonia) from 2005 to 2007.

Life 
Jaak Aab attended school in Ala (Helme Parish in Valga County) and in Viljandi. After graduating from high school in 1978, he studied to become a teacher in Russian language and literature from 1978 to 1986 at the Pedagogical Institute in Tallinn (Tallinna Pedagoogiline Instituut, today known as the University of Tallinn). From 1984 to 1991, he was active as a teacher in Ala and Võhma. From 1991 to 1994, Aab worked in Finland.

Upon returning to Estonia, Aab started working in politics. From November 1994 to January 1996, he served as a senior mayor of the city of Võhma. From August 1998 to February 2002, Aab held the office of senior mayor. From February 2002 to March 2003, Aab was the representative in the Estonian Parliament (Riigikogu). From July 2003 to April 2005, he was the executive director of the Association of Estonian Cities and Muncipilaties (Eesti Linnade ja Valdade Liit), before Prime Minister Andrus Ansip appointed him to his cabinet in 2005. From 13 April 2005 to 5 April 2007, Jaak Aab was the Minister of Social Affairs of the Republic of Estonia.

Since April 2007, Aab has been a representative of the Estonian Parliament and acting chairman of the Social Committee.

Personal life
Jaak Aab was married to teacher Kaie Aab (born 1958). The couple had two daughters. Since 2020 is married to Marian Aab (née Kullerkupp).

References

External links 
 Estonian Ministry of Social Affairs: short biography

 

 

1960 births
Education and Research ministers of Estonia
Estonian Centre Party politicians
Living people
Mayors of places in Estonia
Members of the Riigikogu, 1999–2003
Members of the Riigikogu, 2007–2011
Members of the Riigikogu, 2019–2023
Members of the Riigikogu, 2023–2027
People from Tõrva Parish
Social affairs ministers of Estonia
Tallinn University alumni